Per Gunnar Wetterberg, (born 18 January 1953) is a Swedish author and historian. 

Between 1999 and 2013, he was Sacos CEO for social policies. Since 2010, he is a freelancing writer for Expressen. He has authored several books and has in later years appeared on several television shows for SVT. He is also a board member of Sveriges Radio since 2013, and as well on the board of Lunds University since 2017. Gunnar Westerberg was in the early 1960s, a board member of SECO, he studied at Lunds University. 

He studied history but ended his studies in 1975 to start working at the Foreign office. He has also worked at the Riksrevisionsverket, finance department having worked with the department of public economy and structure between 1992 and 1995. He is part of the panel of expert on the SVT show Fråga Lund, he has along with Parisa Amiri won two seasons of the SVT show På spåret.

Bibliography 
 Det nya samhället. Om den offentliga sektorns möjligheter, Tiden 1991
 Historien upprepar sig aldrig, SNS förlag 1994
 Kommunerna, SNS förlag 1997
 Nästa Sverige, Norstedts 1998
 Kanslern. Axel Oxenstierna i sin tid. Del 1-2, Atlantis 2002
 Levande 1600-tal. Essäer, Atlantis 2003
 Arbetet - välfärdens grundval, SNS förlag 2004
 Den kommunala självstyrelsen, SNS Pocketbibliotek 2004
 Från tolv till ett. Arvid Horn – 1664–1742 (Atlantis 2006
 Efter fyrtiotalisterna, Kommunlitteratur 2008
 Pengarna & makten. Riksbankens historia, Sveriges riksbank i samarbete med Atlantis 2009
 Alkoholen, samhället och arbetslivet, SNS förlag 2009
 Axel Oxenstierna. Makten och klokskapen, Atlantis 2010
 Nils Edén, Bonniers 2010
 Förbundsstaten Norden, Nordiska Rådet 2010
 Kurvans kraft. En bok om befolkningsfrågan, Weylers, 2011
 Wallenberg. Ett familjeimperium, Bonniers, 2013
 Skånes historia I. 11500 f.Kr. - 1375 e.Kr., Bonniers, 2016
 Medelklassens guldägg. Från SPP till Alecta 1917-2017, Dialogos, 2016
 Skånes historia II. 1376-1720, Bonniers, 2017
 Skånes historia III. 1720-2017, Bonniers, 2017
 Träd. En vandring i den svenska skogen, Bonniers, 2018
 Ingenjörerna, Bonniers, 2020
 Prästerna, Bonniers, 2022

References

External links 

1953 births
Living people
Swedish historians